Jean Daniel Houdry (23 February 1914 – 10 January 1994) was a French wrestler. He competed in the men's Greco-Roman light heavyweight at the 1936 Summer Olympics.

References

1914 births
1994 deaths
French male sport wrestlers
Olympic wrestlers of France
Wrestlers at the 1936 Summer Olympics